Republikflucht (German for "desertion from the republic") was the colloquial term in the German Democratic Republic (East Germany) for illegal emigration to West Germany, West Berlin, and non-Warsaw Pact countries; the official term was Ungesetzlicher Grenzübertritt ("unlawful border crossing"). Republikflucht applied to both the 3.5 million Germans who migrated legally from the Soviet occupation zone and East Germany before the Berlin Wall was built on 13 August 1961, and the thousands who migrated illegally across the Iron Curtain until 23 December 1989. It has been estimated that 30,000 people left the GDR per year between 1984 and 1988, and up to 300,000 per year before the construction of the Berlin Wall in 1961.

Legislation 
As of June 28th, 1979, the wording of § 213 StGB was:

(1) Unlawfully crossing the border of the German Democratic Republic or violating legislation regarding temporary residence within the German Democratic Republic as well as transit through the German Democratic Republic is punished by imprisonment of up to two years or conviction on probation, imprisonment or a fine.

(2) Not returning in time, unlawfully returning to the German Democratic Republic or violating government conditions about staying abroad as a citizen of the German Democratic Republic is also punished.

(3) In severe cases, the perpetrator is punished by imprisonment of one or up to eight years. A severe case exists in particular, if:

 the crime endangered life or health of humans;
 the crime took place bearing weapons or under application of dangerous means or methods;
 the crime was executed with increased intensity;
 the crime took place by forgery of documents, false certification, abuse of documents, or by using a hideout;
 the crime was executed together with others;
 the perpetrator was convicted of illegal border crossing before.

(4) Preparation and attempt are punishable.

History

Original legal emigration

Republikflucht is a German term which translates to "desertion from the republic" or "flight from the republic" with migrants known as "Republikflüchtling(e)" ("deserter(s) from the republic"). The term was first used in 1945 almost immediately after World War II by officials in the Soviet Zone of Occupation, four years before the establishment of the German Democratic Republic (East Germany or GDR), in reference to the large number of Germans legally migrating westward to the American, British, and French zones of occupation. The establishment of the GDR in October 1949 saw the continued usage of the term by authorities to describe the process of, and the person(s), leaving for a life in West Germany and West Berlin, or any other Western or non-Warsaw Pact countries.

By the 1950s, the GDR began to tighten its emigration laws and stigmatize Republikflucht in an attempt to curtail legal emigration, including requiring de-registration with East German authorities and permission to leave the country under threat of prison sentences up to three years. A propaganda booklet published by the GDR's ruling Socialist Unity Party of Germany (SED) in 1955 for the use of party agitators outlined the seriousness of "flight from the republic":

Some estimates put the number of those who left the East Berlin, the Soviet occupation zone, and the GDR between 1945 and 1961 at between 3 and 3.5 million people. Close to one million of those who left were refugees and expellees from World War II and the post-war era initially stranded in the Soviet zone or East Berlin.

Berlin Wall construction and criminalized emigration

Republikflucht was effectively criminalized after the GDR began erecting the Berlin Wall on 13 August 1961, which saw the extreme tightening of emigration across the Iron Curtain. The large numbers of emigrants was regarded as an embarrassment for the GDR leadership, owing to its competition with the Federal Republic, and undermined its legitimacy as an independent state. The number of people leaving the GDR following the construction of the Berlin Wall dropped sharply from hundreds of thousands to only several hundred per year.

Article 213 of the GDR Penal Code of 1979 also made it quite clear that crossing the border without first obtaining government authorization would not be taken lightly:

Illegal emigration
Between 1961 and 1989 several thousand East German citizens emigrated by obtaining temporary exit visas and subsequently failing to return, or by engaging in dangerous attempts to cross the Berlin Wall, the Inner German border, or the borders of other Eastern Bloc countries. Those who fled across the fortified borders did so at considerable personal risk of injury or death (see: List of deaths at the Berlin Wall), with several hundred Republikflüchtlinge dying in accidents or by being shot by the GDR Border Troops, while some 75,000 were caught and imprisoned. 

West Germany allowed refugees from the Soviet sector of Berlin, the Soviet zone, or East Germany to apply to be accepted as Vertriebene (expellees) of the sub-group of Soviet Zone Refugees (Sowjetzonenflüchtlinge) under the Federal Expellee Law (BVFG § 3), and thus receive support from the West German government. They had to have fled before 1 July 1990 in an attempt to rescue themselves from an emergency situation – especially one posing a threat to health, life, personal freedom, or freedom of conscience – created by the political conditions imposed by the regime in the territory from which they had escaped (BVFG § 3). The law did not apply to influential former supporters of the eastern political system or to offenders against legality and humanity during the period of Nazi rule or thereafter within East Berlin or East Germany, and finally it was not applicable to any who had fought against the democracy in West Germany or West Berlin (BVFG § 3 (2)).

Legacy 
In 1993, three years after German reunification, the former East German leader Erich Honecker was charged with having ordered soldiers to kill people trying to escape. The trial was postponed due to his bad health, and he died in 1994. Former Stasi chief Erich Mielke was also put on trial on the same charge. In November 1994, however, the presiding judge closed the proceedings, ruling that the defendant was not mentally fit to stand trial.

See also

 Escape attempts and victims of the inner German border
 Eastern Bloc emigration and defection

References

Further reading 
 Fenemore, Mark. Fighting the Cold War in Post-blockade, Pre-wall Berlin: Behind Enemy Lines (Routledge, 2019).
 Ross, Cory. "Before the Wall: East Germans, Communist Authority, and the Mass Exodus to the West" Historical Journal (2002) 45#2 pp. 459-480 online
 Ross, Corey. "East Germans and the Berlin Wall: Popular opinion and social change before and after the border closure of August 1961." Journal of Contemporary History 39.1 (2004): 25–43.
 Sheffer, Edith. Burned Bridge: How East and West Germans Made the Iron Curtain (Oxford University Press, 2014) online.

In German
Volker Ackermann, Der "echte" Flüchtling. Deutsche Vertriebene und Flüchtlinge aus der DDR 1945 – 1961, Osnabrück: 1995 (= Studien zur historischen Migrationsforschung; vol. 1).
 Henrik Bispinck, ""Republikflucht". Flucht und Ausreise als Problem der DDR-Führung", in: Dierk Hoffmann, Michael Schwartz, Hermann Wentker (eds.), Vor dem Mauerbau. Politik und Gesellschaft der DDR der fünfziger Jahre, Munich: 2003, pp. 285–309.
 Henrik Bispinck, "Flucht- und Ausreisebewegung als Krisenphänomene: 1953 und 1989 im Vergleich", in: Henrik Bispinck, Jürgen Danyel, Hans-Hermann Hertle, Hermann Wentker (eds.): Aufstände im Ostblock. Zur Krisengeschichte des realen Sozialismus, Berlin: 2004, pp. ??
 Bettina Effner, Helge Heidemeyer (eds.), Flucht im geteilten Deutschland, Berlin: 2005
 Helge Heidemeyer, Flucht und Zuwanderung aus der SBZ/DDR 1945/49-1961. Die Flüchtlingspolitik der Bundesrepublik Deutschland bis zum Bau der Berliner Mauer, Düsseldorf: 1994 (= Beiträge zur Geschichte des Parliamentarismus und der politischen Parteien; vol. 100).
 Damian van Melis, Henrik Bispinck (eds.), Republikflucht. Flucht und Abwanderung aus der SBZ/DDR 1945–1961, Munich: 2006.

External links 
The Berlin Wall crisis: the view from below, an article from History in Focus
http://www.refugee.org.nz/Headnotes/thes.html#R
BEFORE THE WALL: EAST GERMANS, COMMUNIST AUTHORITY, AND THE MASS EXODUS TO THE WEST

Berlin Wall
East Berlin
Eastern Bloc
Eastern Bloc defectors
 
East German law
East Germany–West Germany relations
 
German words and phrases
Germany–Soviet Union relations
Inner German border